Lacunisphaera is a Gram-negative, aerobic and motile genus of bacteria from the family of Opitutaceae.

See also
 List of bacterial orders
 List of bacteria genera

References

Verrucomicrobiota
Bacteria genera
Taxa described in 2017